The Federation of Agrifood (FEAGRA) was a trade union representing workers in food production and processing in Spain.

The union was established in 2000, when the Federation of Food Processing merged with the Federation of Agriculture.  Like both its predecessors, it affiliated to the Workers' Commissions.  In 2016, it merged into the Federation of Industry.

References

Agriculture and forestry trade unions
Food processing trade unions
Trade unions established in 2000
Trade unions disestablished in 2016
Trade unions in Spain